2nd Saeima was the parliament of Latvia from November 3, 1925, until November 5, 1928. The Social Democrat Pauls Kalniņš continued to hold the post of Speaker of the Saeima to which he was first elected during the 1st Saeima.

2nd Saeima gave confidence to the second cabinet of Kārlis Ulmanis (December 24, 1925 – May 6, 1926), cabinet of Arturs Alberings (May 7, 1926 – December 18, 1926), the firsts cabinet of Marģers Skujenieks (December 19, 1926 – January 23, 1928) and cabinet of Pēteris Juraševskis (January 24, 1928 – November 30, 1928).

Elections and parties
The 2nd Saeima elections were held on October 3–4, 1925, and 74,89% of eligible voters participated. Due to the liberal elections law, 27 parties and candidates lists were elected to the 100 seats, representing all the political and ethnic interest groups of Latvia.  
Latvian Social Democratic Workers' Party – 32 seats
Latvian Farmers' Union – 16 seats
Democratic Centre and Independents union - 5 seats
Latgalian Christian Peasant and Catholic Party – 5 seats
Committee of the German Baltic Parties – 4 seats
Union of Social Democrats – Mensheviks and Rural Workers – 4 seats
National Union – 3 seats
New Farmers-Small Landowners Party – 3 seats
New Farmers' Union – 3 seats
Independent national center – 3 seats
Agudas Israel – 2 seats
The United List of Latgalian Labour Party and Latgalian small-holder and landless Union – 2 seats
Christian National Union – 2 seats
Latgalian Democrat Party – 2 seats
Latgalian Farmers Party – 2 seats
Peace, order and production Union – 2 seats
Russian Orthodox and Russian organizations Bloc – 2 seats
Polish-Catholic Latvian Union of Poles – 2 seats
Old Believer Central Committee – 2 seats
Ceire Cion – 1 seat
Independent candidate – 1 seat
 – 1 seat
Congress of War ravaged districts – 1 seat
Union of Russian Officials – 1 seat
Latgalian Non-party Union – 1 seat
National Farmers Union – 1 seat
Latvia’s Jewish socialdemocratic workers party Bund – 1 seat

List of Saeima deputies 

 Arturs Alberings
 Alfrēds Alslēbens
 Jānis Annuss
 Longins Ausējs
 Kristaps Bahmanis
 Jānis Balodis
 Voldemārs Bastjānis
 Ernests Bauers
 Arveds Bergs
 Roberts Bīlmanis
 Jānis Blumbergs
 Ādolfs Bļodnieks
 Jānis Breikšs
 Augusts Briedis
 Kristaps Bungšs
 Kārlis Būmeisters
 Hugo Celmiņš
 Jūlijs Celms
 Fēlikss Cielēns
 Jānis Čakste
 Kārlis Dēķens
 Kārlis Dišlers
 Morduhs Dubins
 Roberts Dukurs
 Hugo Dzelzītis
 Antons Dzenis
 Arkādijs Eglītis
 Kristaps Eliass
 Hermanis Enzeliņš
 Aleksandrs Evans
 Jūlijs Ērglis
 Vilhelms Firkss
 Markus Gailītis
 Jānis Goldmanis
 Eduards Grantskalns
 Ernests Gulbis
 Kārlis Gulbis
 Jānis Ģībietis
 Jons Hāns
 Vilis Holcmanis
 Eduards Jaunzems
 Staņislavs Jubuls
 Ivans Jupatovs
 Pēteris Juraševskis
 Jānis Kalējs
 Meletijs Kallistratovs
 Ringolds Kalnings
 Augusts Kalniņš
 Bruno Kalniņš
 Nikolajs Kalniņš
 Pauls Kalniņš
 Hermanis Kaupiņš
 Karls Kellers
 Ādolfs Klīve
 Pēteris Kotans
 Andrejs Krastkalns
 Kārlis Krievs
 Bernhards Kublinskis
 Kārlis Kvellbergs
 Alberts Kviesis
 Krišs Ķūķis
 Kārlis Lauva
 Maksis Lazersons
 Pauls Lejiņš
 Rūdolfs Lindiņš
 Francis Logins
 Klāvs Lorencs
 Noijs Maizels
 Fricis Menders
 Gotfrīds Mīlbergs
 Ernests Morics
 Oto Nonācs
 Markus Nuroks
 Jānis Opincāns
 Lukass Ozoliņš
 Alfons Pastors
 Kārlis Pauļuks
 Andrejs Petrevics
 Jānis Pommers
 Eduards Radziņš
 Rainis
 Antons Rancāns
 Jezups Rancāns
 Gustavs Reinhards
 Miķelis Rozentāls
 Jānis Rubulis
 Vladislavs Rubulis
 Ansis Rudevics
 Jānis Rudzis
 Marģers Skujenieks
 Pauls Šīmanis
 Leontijs Špoļanskis
 Jānis Šterns
 Elpidifors Tihoņickis
 Francis Trasuns
 Jezups Trasuns
 Kārlis Ulmanis
 Pēteris Ulpe
 Ādolfs Valters
 Andrejs Veckalns
 Jānis Veržbickis
 Jaroslavs Viļpiševskis
 Jānis Višņa
 Ruvins Vitenbergs
 Pēteris Zeibolts
 Francis Zeps

References

Political history of Latvia
Saeima